Golden Village is a cinema operator based in Singapore, fully owned by Orange Sky Golden Harvest of Hong Kong. It was initially set up as a 50:50 joint venture between Golden Harvest (predecessor of Orange Sky Golden Harvest) and Village Roadshow of Australia. It is the largest cinema chain in Singapore, operating 12 multiplexes and Cineplexes in the country. It joined hands to open a cinema at Great World City, GV Grand. Started in 1992, it opened Asia's first multiplex, the Yishun 10 multiplex. The cinema has the extensive management, operational and marketing skills of Village, as well as broad depth of experience of Golden Harvest in both film distribution and production across Asia.

Golden Village Pictures is the film-distribution arm of Golden Village. The company distributes Village Roadshow Pictures titles such as the Matrix Trilogy, Charlie and The Chocolate Factory, Happy Feet, Ah Boys to Men, That Girl in Pinafore, Annie and The Lego Movie in Singapore, as well as other acquired titles regionally and worldwide.

History
Golden Village was established as a 50/50 joint venture between Golden Harvest (now Orange Sky Golden Harvest) of Hong Kong and Village Roadshow of Australia. The cinema's first operation in the country was on 28 May 1992, with the successful opening of the Yishun 10 complex. Subsequently, it opened more cinemas in Bishan, Tiong Bahru, Boon Lay, Tampines, Marina Square and Plaza Singapura. In 1998, it joined hands to open a cinema at Great World City, GV Grand, with six screens including a Gold Class hall. During the early 2000s, one of the halls was converted into an IMAX theatre, but it closed down in 2004 due to low patronage. It also used to operate at Eastpoint Mall during the early 2000s, but was closed due to low patronage too. 

In October 2006, Golden Village opened a multiplex in VivoCity, the largest multiplex in Singapore with 15 screens, including 3 Gold Class screens and GV Max, one of the largest cinema auditoriums. Its current flagship Cineplex is located at Suntec City with 11 screens including 3 Gold Class screens, taking over the space previously occupied by WE Cinemas and The Rock Auditorium.

In June 2017, Village Roadshow's 50% stake in Golden Village was set to be acquired by Singapore-based media company mm2 Entertainment. However, the bid fell through, as Village Roadshow failed to secure the approval of Orange Sky. Instead, in October 2017, Orange Sky Golden Harvest purchased the Village Roadshow's 50% stake, therefore having full ownership of Golden Village. It is unknown whether the Village name will be dropped from Golden Village as a result of the acquisition.

Cineplexes and multiplexes

Golden Village has 14 cinemas and 113 screens operating in the country currently. All cinemas which opened before 2000 have been refurbished.  GV@Capitol only screens movies from December to March every year, but does not belong to GV. A 15th location will open at Bugis+ in Q4 2022.

Current locations

Former locations

See also
List of cinemas in Singapore
Orange Sky Golden Harvest
Village Roadshow
Village Cinemas
Cathay Cineplexes
Shaw Theatres
WE Cinemas

References

External links
Golden Village (official site)

Cinema chains in Singapore
1992 establishments in Singapore
Singaporean brands